Jeffrey Christian Spink (February 25, 1972 – April 18, 2017) was an American talent manager and film producer.

Early life
J. C. Spink was born in Philadelphia and graduated from Bucknell University.

Career
Spink established Benderspink, a management-production company with partner Chris Bender in 1998 with American Pie in post-production and fourteen writer clients. Benderspink's film production arm had a deal with New Line Cinema for over two decades. Spink produced or executive produced a wide variety of projects, including Cats & Dogs, The Ring franchise, The Butterfly Effect, Kyle XY (for television), Leap Year and A History of Violence, for which he and Bender received a Golden Globe Award nomination. Benderspink continued to make diverse feature films over the past fifteen years including the romantic comedies Just Friends, starring Ryan Reynolds, Monster-in-Law, starring Jennifer Lopez and Jane Fonda, and Red Eye, directed by Wes Craven and starring Rachel McAdams.
 
Spink served as an executive producer on the worldwide blockbuster comedies The Hangover and We're the Millers. Other notable credits include Ride Along and Criminal.

A young J. C. Spink (played by actors Cooper Roth and Zayne Emory) was a recurring minor character in the first two seasons of the ABC comedy The Goldbergs. In addition, the real J. C. Spink had made cameos in two episodes as a bus driver. Spink was a real-life schoolmate of series creator Adam F. Goldberg. According to The Goldbergs, J. C bullied Adam till he saw the error of his ways.

Death
Spink died on April 18, 2017 in West Hollywood, California. On July 12 the same year, the Los Angeles County coroner's office ruled that his death was complications from an accidental undiagnosed drug overdose.

Filmography

References

External links 
 

1972 births
2017 deaths
People from Philadelphia
People from West Hollywood, California
William Penn Charter School alumni
Bucknell University alumni
Film producers from California
Place of birth missing
Television producers from California
Television producers from Pennsylvania
Film producers from Pennsylvania